Greek ephebos εφηβος  (plural: epheboi εφηβοι),  anglicised as ephebe (plural: ephebes), or Latinate ephebus (plural: ephebi) is the term for an adolescent male.  

It may also refer to:
Ephebus (personal name);
The Ephebe sculptural type from antiquity, portraying young men of this age;
The fictional country Ephebe from Terry Pratchett's Discworld series .

See also
Ephebia - official institutions in Greek city-states for training young men of that age 
Ephebophilia, sexual attraction to adolescents, especially in male homosexual adults.
Ephebiphobia, fear of adolescents

 
it:efebo